Masons is an unincorporated community in Charles County, Maryland, United States.

References

Unincorporated communities in Charles County, Maryland
Unincorporated communities in Maryland